The Prescott City Cemetery is the principal burying ground for Prescott, Arkansas. It is located in the northwestern part of the city and is roughly bisected by United States Route 371. The modern (20th-century) portion of the cemetery is located on one side of the highway, while a historic section, also known as the De Ann Cemetery Historic Section, is located on the other. The historic section dates back to not long after the 1874 founding of Prescott, and was formally conveyed to the city as a burial ground in 1880. The site is also known to contain a large number of unmarked graves. Many of Prescott's founders are interred here.

The historic portion of the cemetery was listed on the National Register of Historic Places in 2005.

See also
National Register of Historic Places listings in Nevada County, Arkansas

References

1871 establishments in Arkansas
Cemeteries on the National Register of Historic Places in Arkansas
National Register of Historic Places in Nevada County, Arkansas
Cultural infrastructure completed in 1871
Prescott, Arkansas
Cemeteries established in the 1870s